Song Qiwu (born 20 August 2001) is a Chinese ski jumper who competed in the 2022 Winter Olympics.

He competed at the 2022 Winter Olympics and placed 53rd in qualifying for the men's normal hill individual and did not advance, placed 55th in qualifying for the men's large hill individual and did not advance, and placed 10th with his team in the mixed team event.

References

External links

2001 births
Living people
Chinese male ski jumpers
People from Ziyang
Ski jumpers at the 2022 Winter Olympics
Olympic ski jumpers of China